Limtoc is a crater on the surface of Mars's inner moon Phobos. The crater, the diameter of which is 2 kilometers, is located within the larger, and more well-known surface feature, Stickney crater. Limtoc was officially named by the International Astronomical Union on 29 November 2006, after a character from Gulliver's Travels.

Limtoc formed roughly 109 million years ago, making it one of the youngest features on Phobos. When the Limtoc impactor collided with Phobos, it created a significant amount of ejecta; ejecta which was sent towards the northern edge of Stickney collided with that crater's rim, while ejecta sent towards the southern edge was largely catapulted out of Stickney altogether. This ejecta has partially contributed to the formation of the blue spectral coloration seen on the south-western edge of the Stickney crater, along with the ejecta from Stickney itself.

References

Impact craters on Mars's moons
Phobos (moon)